To minutter for sent is a 1952 Danish crime film directed by Torben Anton Svendsen and starring Poul Reichhardt.

Cast
 Poul Reichhardt as Max Paduan
 Grethe Thordahl as Grete Paduan
 Astrid Villaume as Beth
 Erik Mørk as Urmager Jacobsen
 Johannes Meyer as Vicevært Johansen
 Gunnar Lauring as Kriminalkommissær Normann
 Louis MieheasRenard as Journalist Ib Normann
 Jeanne Darville as Sara Klint
 Poul Müller as Antikvarboghandler Rosenblad
 Per Buckhøj as Kriminalassistenten
 Bjørn PuggaardasMüller as Tjener
 Karl Stegger as Betjent

External links

1952 films
1950s Danish-language films
1952 crime films
Danish black-and-white films
Danish crime films